This is an overview of the progression of the Olympic track cycling record of the women's flying 200 m time trial as recognised by the Union Cycliste Internationale (UCI).

The women's flying 200 m time trial is the qualification for the women's sprint. This discipline was introduced at the 1988 Summer Olympics.

Progression
♦ denotes a performance that is also a current world record. Statistics are correct as of the end of the 2020 Summer Olympics.

* Not listed by the UCI as an Olympic record

References

Track cycling Olympic record progressions